The Trichosphaeriales are an order of sac fungi. It is monotypic, and consists of the single family, the Trichosphaeriaceae.

Genera

Acanthosphaeria
Brachysporium
Collematospora
Coniobrevicolla
Cresporhaphis
Eriosphaeria
Fluviostroma
Kananascus
Miyoshiella
Neorehmia
Oplothecium
Pseudorhynchia
Rizalia
Schweinitziella
Setocampanula
Trichosphaeria
Umbrinosphaeria
Unisetosphaeria

References

 
Ascomycota orders
Taxa named by Margaret Elizabeth Barr-Bigelow
Taxa described in 1983